Juan Borja Tudela (May 17, 1935 – February 2, 2013) was a Northern Mariana Islander career politician and community leader. Tudela was a member of the 14th session of the Northern Mariana Islands House of Representatives and two-term Mayor for the island of Saipan, the capital and largest Municipality in the Northern Mariana Islands, serving from January 2002 to January 2010. He was later succeeded by newly elected Republican, Mayor Donald Flores.

Biography

Early life and education
Tudela was born to Jesus Tudela and Anunciación Borja on May 17, 1936, on the island of Saipan, which was then part of the Japanese mandate for the South Seas Islands. He was raised in the Roman Catholic faith. As a child, he served as altar server alongside his friend, Tomas Aguon Camacho, who would later become the first Bishop of the Roman Catholic Diocese of Chalan Kanoa. Tudela received compulsory education from the Japanese-mandate government until around the time of the invasion of Saipan on June 15, 1944. He was eight years old when the United States' 2nd Marine Division, 4th Marine Division, and 27th Infantry Division landed on Saipan. Saipan was declared secured by the Allied Forces in July, and Tudela's family was relocated to Camp Susupe, where they would remain for the duration of the war and early post-war years.

At the conclusion of the World War II, the Mariana Islands entered a period of reconstruction and transition into a post-war Naval Administrative region. In his early teens, Tudela briefly left Saipan to attend seminary school on the island of Guam with the intention of becoming an ordained Catholic priest at Father Duenas Memorial School in Dededo. Tudela would never complete his religious studies and returned to Saipan, taking up a messenger position with the Naval Technical Training Unit (NTTU) at NAS Tanapag.

Early Career and Community Involvement

Upon his start with the NTTU, Tudela worked as a messenger, later promoted to clerk-typist, eventually reaching the position of supervisor. By the time of his appointment as a supervisor, the islands had transitioned from a post-war Naval Administration to a United Nations established Trust Territory of the Pacific Islands (TTPI) member governed by the United States of America. As a supervisor, Tudela oversaw the procurement and supply of military surplus. Tudela supervised the distribution of these resources across the NMI and other members of the TTPI, still recovering from the effects of 1962 Pacific Typhoon season, specifically, Typhoon Jean, which tore through the islands in present-day CNMI and FSM.

In the 1970s, Tudela moved from the village of Chalan Kanoa to the village of Garapan. He served as community leader in the local Catholic parish before being encouraged to become a district commissioner. Tudela was also instrumental in organizing the local boy scout Scout troop, now district member for the Boy Scouts of America (BSA) in the islands. Tudela witnessed the NMI early economic growth, development of early infrastructure, and early formation of the CNMI government that would later shape his role in the political landscape.

Political career

3rd and 4th Northern Marianas Commonwealth Legislature 
During his tenure as an elected official, Tudela authored/co-authored twenty-two and twenty-three house bills/resolutions as a member of the 3rd and 4th Commonwealth Legislatures respectively, serving in the Northern Mariana Islands House of Representatives

Mayor of Saipan 
Tudela was first elected Mayor of Saipan in November 2001 as a member of the Democratic Party. When he took office in January 2002, Tudela was the first Democratic mayor in nearly two decades. Tudela's successful campaign won him re-election to a second, four-year term in November 2005 as a member of the established, now defunct, Covenant Party, riding the popularity of then CNMI Governor Benigno Fitial.  He was a strong proponent of the NMI-Japan Cultural Exchange Program, which invited Japanese exchange students to the Northern Mariana Islands, helping to re-established the CNMI's connection with mainland Japan. This would eventually lead up to the climactic visit of members in the Imperial House of Japan, Emperor Akihito and the Empress of Japan Michiko.

At the end of his second-term in 2009, Tudela announced his decision not to seek re-election for a third term in 2014, after observing the two-term limit tradition. He was succeeded as Mayor of Saipan by Republican Donald Flores, who took office in January 2010.

Education and Public Service Record

Elected Public Office
2002–2010: Mayor of Saipan

1989–90: Chairman, CNMI Board of Education

1989–1992: Board of Regents—Northern Marianas College (NMC) – *Vice-Chairman

1992-1992: Board of Education (first elected board member)

1985-1985: 4th Commonwealth Legislature, Vice-Speaker

3rd Commonwealth Legislature, Vice-Chairman, HEW Committee

1976-76 Commissioner of Garapan Village District # 11 – *Chief Commissioner of Commissioners in Saipan

Government Service
1997-1997: CNMI-Resident Executive, Indigenous Affairs Office

1981-1981: CNMI-Procurement and Supply—Purchasing & Procurement Officer & Specialist II

1978-1978: CNMI-District Supply Officer

1969-1969: NTTU-Procurement and Supply

1968-1968: TTPI- Treasury Division, Finance

1967-1967: TTPI-Procurement and Supply—Senior Clerk & Stock Control

1962-1962: NTTU-Security Office—Messenger & Guard

NTTU-Special Services Office—Clerk Typist & Office Manager

NTTU-Post Office Manager & Librarian

Community Services
Chairman, Liberation Day

Vice-Chairman, Liberation Day

Chairman, Liberation Day Queens Committee

Vice-Chairman, Liberation Day Queen’s Committee

1995–Present: Knights of Columbus 4th Degree—District Warden

1997-1997: Vice-President, PTA (Marianas High School)

1996-1996: President, PTA (Marianas High School)

1994-1994: President, PTA (Garapan Elementary School)

1992-1992: President, PTA Council

1980-1980: Chairman, Head Start Policy Council board of directors, CAA member

1975-1975: board member, Planning Health Council

1973-1973: Chairman, Boy Scouts of America Troop in Garapan

Personal life and death
Juan Borja Tudela was married to Antonia Lizama Masga, both would raise 9 children, help raise 15 grandchildren, and witness the introduction of 4 out of 10 great-grandchildren. Members of Tudela's family include members of the Sablan, Demapan, Tenorio, Aldan, and Labausa families on the island of Saipan.

Tudela died of late-stage stomach cancer at Queen's Medical Center in Honolulu, Hawaii on February 2, 2013, at the age of 77. His remains were return to Saipan and was buried with full honors and distinction by the CNMI government at Chalan Kanoa Cemetery. His death and funeral set the precedent for all former members and future public servants of the CNMI government to be given full recognition by the local government at the time of their passing and burial.

References

1936 births
2013 deaths
Mayors of Saipan
Members of the Northern Mariana Islands House of Representatives
Democratic Party (Northern Mariana Islands) politicians
People from Saipan